The 1908–09 Massachusetts Agricultural College Aggies men's ice hockey season was the inaugural season of play for the program.

Season
The Aggies began their season hardly well, shutting out opponents in consecutive games, but after a damning loss to Springfield Training the team flagged in their final three games, losing all while not being able to score a goal.

Roster

Standings

Schedule and Results

|-
!colspan=12 style=";" | Regular Season

References

UMass Minutemen ice hockey seasons
Massachusetts Agricultural College
Massachusetts Agricultural College
Massachusetts Agricultural College
Massachusetts Agricultural College